The Kramer Hills are a small range of hills in the Mojave Desert, in northwestern San Bernardino County, southern California.

They are located just south of Kramer Junction and southeast of Boron.

The Kramer Hills are bisected by U.S. Route 395 passing through them. They are in a Bureau of Land Management administered area.

References 

Mountain ranges of the Mojave Desert
Mountain ranges of San Bernardino County, California
Hills of California
Mountain ranges of Southern California